The Reed–Jenkins Act was a statute enacted on May 29, 1928, during the 70th United States Congress.  It repealed previous laws that provided federal funds for Americanization programs supporting Native American schools, educational experimentation agencies, and Native agency farms.  The law was sponsored by Senator David A. Reed (Republican) of Pennsylvania and Representative Thomas A. Jenkins (Republican) of Ohio.

See also
Emergency Quota Act
Immigration Act of 1924
Passport Act of 1926

References

External links
 

1928 in American law
70th United States Congress
United States federal education legislation